This is a list of professors appearing throughout fiction.

Literature

Film

Television

Comics 

 
Lists of fictional characters by occupation